The 1969 Michigan State Spartans football team represented Michigan State University during the 1969 Big Ten Conference football season. Led by 16th-year head coach Duffy Daugherty, the Spartans compiled andoverall record of 4–6 with a mark of 2–5 in conference play, placing ninth in the Big Ten.

Schedule

References

Michigan State
Michigan State Spartans football seasons
Michigan State Spartans football